A means test is a determination of whether an individual or family is eligible for government assistance or welfare, based upon whether the individual or family possesses the means to do without that help.

Canada 

In Canada, means tests are used for student finance (for post-secondary education), legal aid, and "welfare" (direct transfer payments to individuals to combat poverty). They are not generally used for primary and secondary education which are tax-funded. Means tests for public health insurance were once common but are now illegal, as the Canada Health Act of 1984 requires that all the provinces provide universal healthcare coverage to be eligible for subsidies from the federal government. Means tests are also not used for pensions and seniors' benefits, but there is a clawback of Old Age Security payments for people making over $69,562 (in 2012). The Last Post Fund uses a means test on a deceased veteran's estate and surviving widow to determine whether they are eligible for federal funding to subsidize their funeral.

United Kingdom

Resentment over a means test was among the factors giving rise to the National Unemployed Workers' Movement in the United Kingdom. Today, means-tested benefits—meaning that entitlement is affected by the amount of income, savings, capital and assets— is a central feature of the benefit system. Means testing is also part of the determination of legal aid in a magistrates court and for the higher Crown Court. The means test is based on income, family circumstances and essential living costs.
The Beveridge Report of 1942 proposed a system of contributory benefits which would leave only a residual role for means-tested benefits which were then called National Assistance.
The income limits are specified in relation to the needs of a household and for savings there are upper limits for some of the benefits. A couple who are not married may be treated as living together as a married couple.

The main means-tested benefits in 2019 were:

 Income Support
 Income-based Jobseeker's Allowance
 Income-related Employment and Support Allowance  
 Pension Credit 
 Universal Credit
 Housing Benefit
 Working Tax Credit
 Child Tax Credit
Receipt of such benefits other than Housing Benefit and tax credits is a passport to other non-cash help such as free school meals, free prescription charges, Legal Aid, cold weather payment. The claimant, their partner and dependent children are covered. The rules for  free NHS dentistry and optical charges have become more complex since the introduction of Universal Credit and have led to many people facing financial penalties, often wrongly.
People who are not entitled to any of the qualifying benefits may be able to qualify for help with health charges by a separate means test, the NHS Low Income Scheme.
Defunct benefits include:
 National Assistance
 Supplementary Benefit
 Family Credit
 Family Income Supplement
 Social Fund (UK)

United States

Means testing is used to test for eligibility to Medicaid, Temporary Assistance for Needy Families, Section 8 housing, Supplemental Nutrition Assistance Program, Pell Grant, Federal Supplemental Educational Opportunity Grant, Federal Work-Study Program, direct subsidized student loans, as well as the eligibility for relief for debtors who have sufficient financial means to pay a portion of their debts. The means test is perhaps best recognized in the United States as the test used by courts to determine eligibility for Title 11 of the United States Code Chapter 7 or Chapter 13 bankruptcy.

During the Great Depression in the 1930s, the test was used to screen applicants for such programs as Home Relief, and starting in the 1960s, for benefits such as those provided by Medicaid and the Food Stamp Program.

In 1992, third-party Presidential candidate Ross Perot proposed that future Social Security benefits be subjected to a means test; though this was hailed by some as a potential solution to a purported impending crisis in funding the program, few other political candidates since Perot have publicly made the same suggestion, which would require costly investigations and might associate accepting those benefits with social stigma.

In 2005, the US substantially changed its bankruptcy laws, adding a means test to prevent wealthy debtors from filing for Chapter 7 Bankruptcy. The most noteworthy change brought by the 2005 BAPCPA amendments occurred within . The amendments effectively subject most debtors who make an income, as calculated by the Code, above the median income of the debtor's state to an income-based test. This is referred to as the "means test". The means test provides for a finding of abuse if the debtor's income is higher than a specified portion of their debts. If a presumption of abuse is found under the means test, it may be rebutted only in the case of "special circumstances".

Debtors whose income is below the state's median income are not subject to the means test. Notably, the Code-calculated income may be higher or lower than the debtor's actual income at the time of filing for bankruptcy. This has led some commentators to refer to the bankruptcy code's "current monthly income" as "presumed income".  If the debtor's debt is not primarily consumer debt, then the means test is inapplicable.

Thus, the means test is a formula designed to keep filers with higher incomes from filing for Chapter 7 bankruptcy. These filers may use Chapter 13 bankruptcy to repay a portion of their debts, but may not use Chapter 7 to wipe out their debts altogether. The bankruptcy means test is complex and the terms that govern many parts of it – including those terms that control whether it applies at all – are of unsettled definition.

Other examples
Other examples of means testing include Medifund in Singapore and Medical Cards in Ireland. Both are used in the healthcare sector. Australia uses a means test for its Age Pension.

See also
Entitlement
Entitlement theory
Social welfare
Conditional cash transfer

References

External links 
 U.S. Bankruptcy Courts information on means testing
 LSC (UK) means-tested eligibility calculator

Welfare economics
United States bankruptcy law
Social security
Welfare reform
Poverty law